Vselovod Borisovich Ivanov (born ) is a contemporary Russian painter, the author of paintings on the theme of Slavic paganism and Slavic fantasy.

Early life 
Ivanov was born in 1950, in Belomorsk in Karelia. In the 1970s, he participated in city, regional, and all-Union exhibitions of amateur artists, and in 1978, he graduated from the Tver Art Institute. After 1978 he was a member and worked through the Artists' Union of the USSR.

Art 
Ivanov is a member of the UNESCO International Federation of Artists. In 2011, his collection Ancient Russia was exhibited at UNESCO headquarters in Paris.

References

External links
Official website (currently down)
Official website (functional, archived from 2022)

Russian painters
People from Karelia
Soviet painters
1950 births
Living people